Star Appeal (1970-1987) was an Irish-bred Thoroughbred and sire who won top-class races in four countries. In 1975, he became the first German-trained racehorse to win the Prix de l'Arc de Triomphe.

Racing career
Star Appeal was initially raced in Ireland, where his first trainer was John Oxx senior. He then moved to Germany where he achieved success with his third trainer, Theo Grieper.

Star Appeal was a  horse who campaigned in major races at home and across Europe. Among Star Appeal's wins were back-to-back editions of the Grosser Preis der Badischen Wirtschaft and the Frankfurt Pokal in Germany, Italy's Premio Carlo d'Alessio and Premio Carlo d'Alessio, England's Eclipse Stakes , and the most important win of his career at Longchamp Racecourse in Paris, France, the Prix de l'Arc de Triomphe. Ridden by Greville Starkey, he won the Prix de l'Arc de Triomphe at odds of 118:1, defeating a large field which included the great Dahlia and Allez France.  For his 1975 performances, Star Appeal was rated the 1975 European Horse of the Year.

Stud record
Retired from racing following a fifth-place finish to Nobiliary in the Washington, D.C. International Stakes at Laurel Park Racecourse in the United States,  Star Appeal served stallion duty at the English National Stud. He sired such good runners as Kamiros II, Madam Gay, and Star Way.

Star Appeal died at age seventeen on Christmas Day, 1987.

References
 Video at YouTube of Star Appeal winning the 1975 Prix de l'Arc de Triomphe (German language)
 Star Appeal's complete Racing Career
 Star Appeal's progeny

1970 racehorse births
1987 racehorse deaths
Racehorses bred in Ireland
Racehorses trained in Ireland
Racehorses trained in Germany
Arc winners
European Thoroughbred Horse of the Year
Thoroughbred family 5-d